Musiikin ystävälliset kasvot is an EP by CMX. It was recorded in 1991 to be released as a four song EP, but instead the title track was released as a single. The EP was finally released in 1998 under the name Musiikin ystävälliset kasvot + 5 and included six songs. The originally planned four song EP was released in 2002 as a part of Veljeskunta Gold.

The title track was re-recorded by the band in 1997 and released on the compilation Cloaca Maxima as "Musiikin ystävälliset kasvot '97".

Track listing

"Musiikin ystävälliset kasvot" (single) 
 "Musiikin ystävälliset kasvot" – 4:01
 "Vieraita avaruudesta (II)" – 3:39

Musiikin ystävälliset kasvot (original EP) 
 "Musiikin ystävälliset kasvot" – 4:01
 "Vieraita avaruudesta (I)" – 2:54
 "Polyhymnia" – 2:40
 "Vieraita avaruudesta (II)" – 3:39

Musiikin ystävälliset kasvot + 5 
 "Polyhymnia" – 2:40
 "Vieraita avaruudesta (I)" – 2:54
 "Vieraita avaruudesta (II)" – 3:39
 "Musiikin ystävälliset kasvot" – 4:01
 "Venehellä vaskisella" – 3:25
 "Vuori" – 3:15

Personnel 
 A. W. Yrjänä – vocals, bass
 Janne Halmkrona – guitar
 Timo Rasio – guitar (except #6)
 Pasi Isometsä – guitar (on #6)
 Pekka Kanniainen – drums

References 

CMX (band) albums
1998 EPs